"My Home Town" is a song written and performed by Paul Anka.  The song was arranged by Sid Feller.
It reached #8 on the U.S. pop chart in 1960 and #10 in the Canadian CHUM Charts.

Other Facts
The single's B-side, "Something Happened", reached #41 on the U.S. pop chart.
The song ranked #77 on Billboard magazine's Top 100 singles of 1960.

Other versions
César Costa, 1961
Juan Gabriel released a version of the song featuring Anka on his 2009 album Mis Canciones, Mis Amigos.  The version had been originally released on Anka's 1998 album Amigos.

References

1960 songs
1960 singles
Songs written by Paul Anka
Paul Anka songs
Juan Gabriel songs
ABC Records singles